Bhola Maheswar is a mythological serial broadcast by Sananda TV. It's a lord Shiva saga. The saga is primarily focused on Lord Shiva (Jeetu Kamal) and Parvati (Jasmine Roy).

Cast
 Jeetu (Bhola Maheswar)
 Jasmin Roy (Parvati)
 Suman Kundu (Vishnu)

References

External links
 Official Website

 
 

Indian television soap operas
Bengali-language television programming in India